An industry superannuation fund (or, simply, 'industry fund') is an Australian superannuation fund originally established to provide for the retirement of workers from a specific industry. While industry funds are no longer tied to specific industries, they remain not-for-profit, mutual funds which are membership-based and do not have shareholders. Industry super funds can be contrasted with retail super funds (or 'wholesale master trusts'), which are public offer funds managed by financial institutions. Profits from retail funds are distributed to shareholders or investors (the trustees of the fund), whereas industry funds return profits directly to members.

Industry Super Australia (ISA) is the peak body of the industry fund sector.

From 1 July 2005, choice of fund rules came into effect, giving most Australian employees the option to choose the fund into which their employers paid their superannuation contributions. In practice, over 75% of workers remained with their employer’s default fund, which was usually an industry fund. From this time, industry super funds were also no longer required to be industry-specific, and most became open to membership by a majority of Australian workers. Such open funds are called public offer funds. Since 1 January 2014, all employers must select an approved MySuper account as their default super fund into which they must pay all default super guarantee contributions (minimum employer contributions). However, employees can nominate an alternative investment fund, called a stapled super fund.

The Fair Work Commission determines which superannuation funds are suitable to be industry super funds and adopted by employers as default funds.

History of industry super funds
Prior to 1992, superannuation was common among workers; however, there existed no national legislative requirement for employers to pay superannuation for their employees. Instead, industrial awards negotiated by the union movement provided for businesses to contribute to superannuation funds for, and on behalf of, their staff. This system was not uniform across the economy, and superannuation policies were tied to individual awards, which differed between industries.

In 1992, the Keating Labor government introduced a compulsory ‘Superannuation Guarantee’ system as part of a major reform package to help relieve the growing burden on the taxpayer-funded government pension scheme. The change came about through a tripartite agreement between the government, employer groups and trade unions. Trade unions agreed to forgo a national 3% pay increase for their members, which would instead be put into the new superannuation system for all employees in Australia. This was matched by employers' contributions which were set to increase over time. This reform resulted in 72% of Australian workers being covered by retirement savings schemes.

Both union and employer organisations were keen to ensure that money invested into superannuation would be protected from high fees and commission products. This led to the establishment of trade union-based industry super funds, in contrast to pre-existing retail funds.

Today
Today, industry funds are non-profit mutual funds with over 13 million accounts. Industry super funds have policies designed for the benefit of members, and governed by trustees representing employers and employees within the industry.
, ISA members are:

 AustralianSuper
 Aware Super
 CareSuper
 Cbus
 Energy Super
 FIRSTSuper
 HESTA
 Hostplus
 legalsuper
 Media Super
 Spirit Super
 NGS Super
 REISuper
 TWUSUPER

Other industry super funds (that are not members of ISA) include  Aware Super,  REST Industry Super, and  UniSuper. ME Bank was owned by 26 industry super funds, until it was sold to Bank of Queensland in 2021.

Industry Super Australia
Industry Super Australia (ISA) is "a research and advocacy body for Industry SuperFunds", which aims to make the most of the retirement savings of the individual members of its member funds. It is a peak body for the industry superannuation sector. ISA comprises 15 industry super funds as members, each of which is not-for-profit, including AustralianSuper, Hostplus and Cbus. ISA-member funds collectively hold about 5 million accounts.

, the Board of ISA is chaired by Greg Combet and includes representatives from industry super funds, former state and federal ministers, and the ACTU Secretary, Sally McManus.

Advertising campaigns 
ISA manages collective projects on behalf of its member funds, including research, policy development, government relations and advocacy, as well as coordinating the Industry SuperFunds Joint Marketing Campaign. The campaign is responsible for a number of prominent advertising and marketing campaigns, including the long-running “Compare the Pair” television and press campaign, which has run multiple iterations over many years, has achieved household recognition throughout Australia. The campaign is currently in its 3rd generation.

The "From little things" campaign used Paul Kelly and Kev Carmody's song "From Little Things, Big Things Grow" from September 2009 until the end of 2014. After that, the Ben Lee song "We're All in This Together" would be used.

Consolidation of accounts
In September 2018, ISA arranged a deal by 19 industry super funds to consolidate superannuation accounts of all of their members. Involving half a million inactive accounts containing few funds, it is estimated that it may collectively save its members around  a year in what they would otherwise pay in fees and life insurance premiums. All members of ISA, as well as REST, Equipsuper and First State Super, have signed up to the deal.

If any active accounts exist for the member in question with any of the funds, the money in the inactive account is automatically transferred into that fund.

Submissions and representations 
Since ISA’s inception, it has made submissions to government on a number of superannuation-related topics, including:

 The Murray Inquiry (2014) into Australia’s financial systems, with particular reference to superannuation
 The Cooper Review (2010) into the superannuation system and regulatory improvements 
 The Senate Standing Committee on Community Affairs covering the proposed tightening of pension eligibility
  The Trowbridge Review into potential conflicted remuneration and its effect on life insurance advice
 The Parliamentary Joint Committee on Corporations and Financial Systems Inquiry 
 The Senate Economics Legislation Committee (2013) review for streamlining the Future of Financial Advice Bill.

Retail super funds
The four major banks in Australia and other financial institutions own the majority of for-profit retail super funds. These owners of the retail funds have been lobbying federal governments for legislative changes to de-regulate the process traditionally used to nominate workplace default funds and make it easier for employers to adopt a bank-owned fund. In 2012, the Abbott government committed to opening up the default fund section system suggesting that doing so will generate greater competition.

As at July 2018, the major retail super funds were:

AMP Flexible Super
Bendigo Smart Start Super (Bendigo Bank)
BT Super For Life (Westpac)
ING DIRECT Living Super (ING Australia). In December 2015, ING had AU$1.6 billion in super funds under management, with 34,000 active superannuation accounts in 2014.
MLC Masterkey Super (National Australia Bank)
 Colonial First State (Commonwealth Bank)
OnePath (ANZ Bank)
Suncorp Everyday Super (Suncorp)

Testimony at the Hayne Royal Commission highlighted the various actual and potential conflicts of interest that exist retail super funds are owned by banks: for example, when bank advisors are required to recommend the financial products of their bank to a member of the retail super fund, this may not be in the best interest of that member. Consequently, several banks have since commenced processes to dispose of their wealth management divisions.

See also
Superannuation in Australia

References

External links 
 
 
 Society at a Glance 2014 Highlights: AUSTRALIA OECD Social Indicators
 Melbourne Mercer Global Pension Index: Australia
 Social Security Programs Throughout the World: Asia and the Pacific, 2014

Superannuation in Australia